Seyid Yusifli (known as Canavarlı or Dzhanavarly until 2008) is a village and municipality in the Barda Rayon of Azerbaijan. It has a population of 302.

References 

Populated places in Barda District